Arthur Sullivan (1842–1900) was an English composer.

Arthur Sullivan may also refer to:

Arthur Sullivan (Australian soldier) (1896–1937), Australian recipient of the Victoria Cross
Arthur Sullivan (Manitoba politician), candidate in 1922 Manitoba general election
Artie Sullivan, singer who worked with Dick Campbell (singer-songwriter)

See also
Art Sullivan (1950–2019), Belgian singer
Arthur O'Sullivan (disambiguation)